Hans Huber may refer to:

 Hans Huber (composer) (1852–1921), Swiss composer
 Hans Huber (boxer) (born 1934), German boxer
 Hans Huber (handballer) (born 1951), Swiss handball player
 Hans Huber (ice hockey) (1929–2014), German ice hockey player
 Hans Huber (judge) (1901–1987), Swiss Supreme Court judge
 Hans Huber (publisher)
 Max Huber (statesman) (Hans Max Huber, 1874–1960), Swiss judge and president of the Permanent Court of International Justice